Willingboro Township is a township in Burlington County, in the U.S. state of New Jersey. The township is a suburb of Philadelphia and part of the state's South Jersey region.

As of the 2020 United States census, the township's population was 31,889, an increase of 260 (+0.8%) from the 2010 census count of 31,629, which in turn reflected a decline of 1,379 (−4.2%) from the 33,008 counted in the 2000 census.

The township has British roots going back to the 17th century. Abraham Levitt and Sons purchased and developed Willingboro land in the 1950s and 1960s as a planned community in their Levittown model.

The 1967 book The Levittowners, by sociologist Herbert J. Gans, was a famous case study in American urban sociology based on the development of Levittown. Willingboro later became a predominantly African American suburb.

History

Willingboro was one of the original nine divisions in the organization of Burlington County within West Jersey, and was originally formed as the "Constabulary of Wellingborrow" on November 6, 1688. At the time, it included present day Delanco Township, New Jersey. The original name of Wellingborough was after the community in England, which was the hometown of Thomas Olive, who led the original settlers into what would become Willingboro Township. Other spellings were used at different times.

After the establishment of the United States and the State of New Jersey, the community was formally incorporated as "Willingborough Township", one of New Jersey's initial group of 104 townships, on February 21, 1798, by the New Jersey Legislature when it enacted "An Act incorporating the Inhabitants of Townships, designating their Powers, and regulating their Meetings", P.L. 1798, p. 289. This makes Willingboro one of the oldest townships in the State. Portions of the township were taken to form Beverly borough (March 5, 1850, now Beverly city) and Beverly Township (March 1, 1859, now known as Delanco Township).

In the 1950s and 1960s, Willingboro was the location for a massive residential development by Levitt & Sons. The town was to be Levitt & Sons' third and largest Levittown development, following similar projects in New York and Pennsylvania. Levitt acquired the great majority of the land in Willingboro; the historic community of Rancocas, in the southeast portion of the township, was annexed to Westampton Township to keep it from being bulldozed, as Levitt wished to keep the development within the boundaries of a single municipality. The first Levittown homes were sold in June 1958, at which time the community was already known as Levittown, New Jersey.

The town's name was changed from the original Willingboro to "Levittown Township" by a referendum of township residents held on November 3, 1959. The community used the name "Levittown, New Jersey" in 1958, and "Levittown Township" from 1959 to 1963. A referendum held on the issue on November 5, 1963, changed the name back to Willingboro. The name change was passed by a narrow margin of 3,123 to 3,003. In retaliation, Levitt refused to donate any more schools to the fast-growing community. With residential development, the 1950 population of 852 rapidly climbed to 11,861 in 1960; and 43,386 in 1970.

When homes for the new Levittown were first being sold in 1958, Levitt and Sons had a policy against sales to African Americans. W. R. James, an African-American officer in the Army's Criminal Investigation Division, was stationed at nearby Fort Dix and applied to purchase a Levittown home. On June 29, 1958, an agent of Levitt and Sons told him that the new Levittown development would be an all-white community. James filed suit against the company challenging their policy. A friend of his, who worked at the New Jersey Division of Civil Rights, said that it was illegal in New Jersey to discriminate in federally-subsidized housing. At the time, de facto racial segregation in housing existed in many areas in the United States. Levittown was receiving mortgage insurance from the Federal Housing Administration. But as of 1958, the law had not been tested.

James sued Levitt in a case that ultimately went to the New Jersey Supreme Court, which upheld lower court rulings in favor of James. James was not the first African American to move into Willingboro. Given James' success in his suit, Charles and Vera Williams purchased a house and moved into the community in 1960, the first African-American family in Willingboro. James eventually moved into Millbrook Park in 1960.  He served as head of the local chapter of the NAACP and eventually became a minister. An elementary school in Willingboro was named in his honor.

Following the court case, Levitt developed a thorough integration program. The company set up an integration committee headed by Howard Lett, an African American. Lett created a five-point program, which included the announcement by community leaders of Levitt's plan to desegregate housing, and a thorough briefing program for Levitt employees, government officials, the police and the press. Lett recommended an attempt to discourage anti-integration activities known as "Operation Hothead". Lett created a Human Relations Council to oversee possible disputes in community. James served as a member of that committee. The committee tried to solve problems of juvenile delinquency in the township. It opposed a curfew passed by the Township Council in the early 1970s. The curfew was later dropped, but reintroduced later.

The African-American population of Willingboro increased throughout the 1960s; by 1964 there were 50 African-American families. By 1970, African Americans represented about 11% of the population. During the early 1970s, several homeowners said they were approached by local real estate agents and told that their neighborhood was becoming increasingly African-American and home values could decline if they did not sell quickly; a practice known as blockbusting. While the Human Relations Council could not prove these claims, it made recommendations to help foster better relations between ethnic communities in the township and calm concerns.

The township in 1974 enacted an ordinance that prohibited the posting of "for sale" or "sold" signs on real estate. Proponents of the ordinance alleged the purpose was to maintain integration.  Many other communities had enacted similar laws in reaction to the practice of blockbusting in the 1960s and 1970s. The Supreme Court in the 1977 case of Linmark Associates, Inc. v. Willingboro ruled that the ordinance violated the First Amendment protections for free speech, which applied to commercial needs.

Geography
According to the U.S. Census Bureau, the township had a total area of 8.14 square miles (21.08 km2), including 7.73 square miles (20.01 km2) of land and 0.41 square miles (1.07 km2) of water (5.09%).

The township borders the Burlington County municipalities of Burlington Township, Delanco Township, Delran Township, Edgewater Park Township, Moorestown Township, Mount Laurel Township and Westampton Township. Rancocas Creek drains Willingboro and forms its SW boundary while U.S. Route 130 forms its NW boundary.

Unincorporated communities, localities and place names located partially or completely within the township include Bortons Landing, Charleston and Cooperstown.

Parks and sections
Willingboro is divided into several sections called parks. Each section's street names begin with the same letter as the corresponding section name.  For example, streets in Pennypacker Park all begin with the letter "P". This is the case with all parks, excluding Martin's Beach and certain streets in Rittenhouse Park.  Some streets that predate Levittown retained their original names, such as Charleston Road.

Originally, each park or section had its own swimming pool for residents' use.  Residents' families would receive free swim tags after showing applicable IDs at each section's school or the community office. However, some swimming pools, such as Hawthorne Park, have been inactive for years. Free lessons and other events were focused on these "park" pools during the summer months.  By the 1990s, only Pennypacker Park and Country Club Park had operating summer pools.  Finally, Country Club Park and Pennypacker Park have  been denoted the "community pools" at this time.

The township's parks include: 
 Buckingham Park
 Country Club Ridge, laid out in the 1960s around a golf course designed by Robert Trent Jones.
 Pennypacker Park
 Millbrook Park
 Martin's Beach
 Deer Park
 Somerset Park (First house was occupied here.)
 Windsor Park
 Garfield Park
 Garfield Park East
 Garfield Park North
 Rittenhouse Park
 Twin Hill Park
 Ironside Court (Non-residential, Public Works Department and some industry.)
 Hawthorne Park
 Fairmount Park

A small, unnamed section of the township uses area code 856. The rest of Willingboro is in area code 609.

Climate
The local hardiness zone is 7a.

Demographics

2020 census

2010 census

The Census Bureau's 2006–2010 American Community Survey showed that (in 2010 inflation-adjusted dollars) median household income was $66,479 (with a margin of error of +/− $4,323) and the median family income was $73,968 (+/− $2,888). Males had a median income of $48,323 (+/− $2,553) versus $40,313 (+/− $3,074) for females. The per capita income for the township was $25,989 (+/− $1,048). About 6.9% of families and 8.6% of the population were below the poverty line, including 14.5% of those under age 18 and 3.8% of those age 65 or over.

Arts and culture
The rap/R&B group City High was established in the township.

Government

Local government 
Willingboro Township is governed within the Faulkner Act, formally known as the Optional Municipal Charter Law, under the Council-Manager form of government (Plan E), enacted by direct petition and implemented as of January 1, 1962. The township is one of 42 municipalities (of the 564) statewide that use this form of government. The current Council-Manager form of government was adopted by referendum in November 1960 based on the recommendations of a Charter Study Commission. The elections for the first council to operate under the new Council-Manager form of government took place in November 1961, with the new council taking office as of January 1, 1962, under the new form. The Township Council is comprised of five members, who are elected in partisan elections to serve four-year terms in office on a staggered basis, with two or three seats coming up for election as part of the November general election during odd-numbered years. At a reorganization held during the first week of January after each election, the council selects a Mayor and Deputy Mayor from among its members.

, the members of the Willingboro Township Council are Mayor Kaya McIntosh (D, term on council ends December 31, 2023; term as mayor ends 2022), Deputy Mayor Samantha Whitfield (D, term on council ends 2023; term as deputy mayor ends 2022), Nathaniel Anderson (D, 2025), Rebecca Perrone (D, 2025) and Dr. Tiffani A. Worthy (D, 2023).

In July 2017, the council selected Rebecca Perone from a list of three candidates nominated by the Democratic municipal committee to fill the seat that had been held by Christopher "Chris" Walker expiring in December 2019 until he resigned from his post as mayor in June 2017.

The township council appointed Chris Walker in October 2013 to fill the vacant seat of Ken Gordon, after a New Jersey Superior Court judge ruled that Gordon's seat was vacant based on his having missed a series of council meetings. Eddie Campbell was named to fill Gordon's former position as deputy mayor. Darvis Holley was appointed in April 2014 to fill the vacant seat of Jim Ayrer, who had resigned after serving on the council for 34 years.

Federal, state, and county representation 
Willingboro Township is located in the 3rd Congressional District and is part of New Jersey's 7th state legislative district.

 

Burlington County is governed by a Board of County Commissioners comprised of five members who are chosen at-large in partisan elections to serve three-year terms of office on a staggered basis, with either one or two seats coming up for election each year; at an annual reorganization meeting, the board selects a director and deputy director from among its members to serve a one-year term. , Burlington County's Commissioners are
Director Felicia Hopson (D, Willingboro Township, term as commissioner ends December 31, 2024; term as director ends 2023),
Deputy Director Tom Pullion (D, Edgewater Park, term as commissioner and as deputy director ends 2023),
Allison Eckel (D, Medford, 2025),
Daniel J. O'Connell (D, Delran Township, 2024) and 
Balvir Singh (D, Burlington Township, 2023). 
Burlington County's Constitutional Officers are
County Clerk Joanne Schwartz (R, Southampton Township, 2023)
Sheriff James H. Kostoplis (D, Bordentown, 2025) and 
Surrogate Brian J. Carlin (D, Burlington Township, 2026).

Politics
As of March 2011, there were a total of 20,713 registered voters in Willingboro Township, of which 12,117 (58.5% vs. 33.3% countywide) were registered as Democrats, 1,268 (6.1% vs. 23.9%) were registered as Republicans and 7,322 (35.3% vs. 42.8%) were registered as Unaffiliated. There were 6 voters registered as Libertarians or Greens. Among the township's 2010 Census population, 65.5% (vs. 61.7% in Burlington County) were registered to vote, including 85.7% of those ages 18 and over (vs. 80.3% countywide).

In the 2012 presidential election, Democrat Barack Obama received 15,635 votes here (91.4% vs. 58.1% countywide), ahead of Republican Mitt Romney with 1,300 votes (7.6% vs. 40.2%) and other candidates with 63 votes (0.4% vs. 1.0%), among the 17,101 ballots cast by the township's 22,031 registered voters, for a turnout of 77.6% (vs. 74.5% in Burlington County). In the 2008 presidential election, Democrat Barack Obama received 16,104 votes here (90.0% vs. 58.4% countywide), ahead of Republican John McCain with 1,616 votes (9.0% vs. 39.9%) and other candidates with 75 votes (0.4% vs. 1.0%), among the 17,899 ballots cast by the township's 21,755 registered voters, for a turnout of 82.3% (vs. 80.0% in Burlington County). In the 2004 presidential election, Democrat John Kerry received 12,226 votes here (81.1% vs. 52.9% countywide), ahead of Republican George W. Bush with 2,701 votes (17.9% vs. 46.0%) and other candidates with 85 votes (0.6% vs. 0.8%), among the 15,067 ballots cast by the township's 20,197 registered voters, for a turnout of 74.6% (vs. 78.8% in the whole county).

In the 2013 gubernatorial election, Democrat Barbara Buono received 6,513 ballots cast (70.6% vs. 35.8% countywide), ahead of Republican Chris Christie with 2,453 votes (26.6% vs. 61.4%) and other candidates with 40 votes (0.4% vs. 1.2%), among the 9,227 ballots cast by the township's 21,474 registered voters, yielding a 43.0% turnout (vs. 44.5% in the county). In the 2009 gubernatorial election, Democrat Jon Corzine received 8,235 ballots cast (83.7% vs. 44.5% countywide), ahead of Republican Chris Christie with 1,296 votes (13.2% vs. 47.7%), Independent Chris Daggett with 169 votes (1.7% vs. 4.8%) and other candidates with 64 votes (0.7% vs. 1.2%), among the 9,837 ballots cast by the township's 21,588 registered voters, yielding a 45.6% turnout (vs. 44.9% in the county).

Education 
Willingboro Township Public Schools serves students in pre-kindergarten through twelfth grade. As of the 2020–21 school year, the district, comprised of nine schools, had an enrollment of 3,456 students and 277.0 classroom teachers (on an FTE basis), for a student–teacher ratio of 12.5:1. Schools in the district (with 2020–21 enrollment data from the National Center for Education Statistics) are Garfield East Early Childhood Development Center with 214 students in grades Pre-K–K, 
J. Cresswell Stuart Early Childhood Development Center with 305 students in grades Pre-K–K, 
Hawthorne Elementary School with 352 students in grades 1–4, 
W.R. James Sr. Elementary School with 353 students in grades 1–4, 
Twin Hills Elementary School with 321 students in grades 1–4, 
Levitt Intermediate School with 558 students in grades 5–6, 
Willingboro Memorial Middle School with 573 students in grades 7–8, and 
Willingboro High School with 674 students in grades 9–12.

During the early development of the township, all high school students attended Levittown High School for grades 9–12 (LHS was renamed "Levitt Jr. High School" when the new high school—John F. Kennedy—was opened in 1964). It was the only junior high school, grades 7 through 9, until Memorial Junior High School opened in 1968. The substantial student population at JFK HS required that the school go to split sessions and only was able to house grades 10–12, with the freshmen classes divided between Memorial and Levitt junior high schools. In 1975, Willingboro HS was opened and became the "sister" school, located only about two miles apart—both on JFK Way. This is the way the township was until JFK HS became a middle school in 1990, leaving Willingboro as the only high school. By this time, the township population fell and Levitt Junior High School was closed to become township offices and storage. Memorial Junior High School would remain open for college classes for Burlington County College. Kennedy Middle School eventually closed and became Kennedy Center, a community center for the performing arts, an additional gym for events, and classrooms for college classes.

The S.W. Bookbinder, J.A. McGinley and Martin Luther King Jr. Elementary Schools were closed at the end of the 2005–2006 school year as part of an effort to save about $3.6 million, through the reduction of as many as 100 staff members and class sizes increased as large as 27 at the five remaining elementary schools. The cuts were needed to fill a two-year budget deficit of nearly $10 million.

Students from Willingboro Township, and from all of Burlington County, are eligible to attend the Burlington County Institute of Technology, a countywide public school district that serves the vocational and technical education needs of students at the high school and post-secondary level at its campuses in Medford and Westampton Township.

The Willingboro Public Library (WPL) is the municipal public library for the community. It first opened in 1960 and operates independently from the Burlington County Library System. Before 2003, the library was housed in the township's municipal building on Salem Road. B1. Print.</ref> and is an anchor for the new Willingboro Town Center on Route 130.

Transportation

Roads and highways

U.S. Route 130 is the main highway serving Willingboro. It straddles the township's borders with Delanco Township and Edgewater Park Township.Burlington County Highway Map, New Jersey Department of Transportation. Accessed February 7, 2023.

Public transportation
NJ Transit provides bus service on 409 / 417 / 418 routes between Trenton and Philadelphia.South Jersey Transit Guide , Cross County Connection, as of April 1, 2010. Accessed December 2, 2013.

BurLink bus service is offered on the B1 route (between Beverly and Pemberton) and on the B2 route (between Beverly and Westampton).

Academy Bus provides service from Willingboro and at the park-and-ride facility near Exit 5 of the New Jersey Turnpike in Westampton to the Port Authority Bus Terminal and other street service in Midtown Manhattan and to both Jersey City and the Wall Street area in Lower Manhattan.Willingoro / Westampton to Lower Manhattan, Academy Bus. Accessed December 2, 2013.

Notable people

People who were born in, residents of, or otherwise closely associated with Willingboro Township include:

 Mark Adamo (born 1962), composer and librettist with New York City Opera
 Malik Allen (born 1978), NBA power forward for the Minnesota Timberwolves
 Priscilla B. Anderson (born 1935), politician who served in the New Jersey General Assembly from the 7th Legislative District from 1992 to 1994 and as mayor of Willingboro
 Tony Bellinger (born 1957), retired professional soccer defender who played in the NASL for the Dallas Tornado
 T. J. Brennan (born 1989), professional ice hockey defenseman who has played in the NHL for the Buffalo Sabres, Florida Panthers and Toronto Maple Leafs
 Cardiak (born 1988), music producer for 50 Cent, Rick Ross, Fabolous, Meek Mill and Lloyd Banks
 Sean Casey (born 1974), Major League Baseball first baseman for the Boston Red Sox
 Fannie Lee Chaney (1921–2007), baker who became a civil rights activist following the murder of her son James Chaney in Mississippi in 1964 by the Ku Klux KlanPettus, Emily Wagster via Associated Press. "Fannie Lee Chaney, 84, mother of slain civil rights worker", Boston Globe, May 24, 2007. Accessed December 2, 2013. "Her death was announced yesterday by her son, Ben, from her home in Willingboro, N.J."
 Mike Chioda (born 1964), WWE professional wrestling Referee and Raw Senior Referee
 Ant Clemons (born 1991), singer-songwriter, who released his debut album Happy 2 Be Here in March 2020
 Tom Davis (born ), basketball player best known for his college career at Delaware State University between 1987–88 and 1990–91 in which he had more than 2,200 points and 1,000 rebounds
 Gary Dourdan (born 1966), actor best known for playing the character Warrick Brown on the television series CSI: Crime Scene Investigation Chuck Faucette (born 1963), former NFL linebacker who played for the San Diego Chargers for two seasons
 William Franklin (1731–1813), last Colonial Governor of New Jersey, son of Benjamin Franklin
 Vance Gilbert, folk music singer/songwriter
 James Green (born 1992), amateur wrestler who won bronze at the 2015 World Wrestling Championships at Men's freestyle 70 kg
 Anthony Griggs (born 1960), former NFL linebacker who played for the Philadelphia Eagles and Cleveland Browns
 Erskine Hawkins (1914–1993), jazz trumpeter and big band leader
 Derrick Hodge (born 1979), bassist, composer, music producer, music director and recording artist
 Charles W. Hooper, Lieutenant General in the United States Army who has held the position of Director of the Defense Security Cooperation Agency since 2017
 Barbara Kalik (born 1936), politician who served in the New Jersey General Assembly from the 7th Legislative District from 1978 to 1992 and as mayor of Willingboro
 Stephen Kasprzyk (born 1982), rower who represented the United States in the Men's eight event at the 2012 Summer Olympics in London
 Michelle Kosinski (born 1974), journalist who has been a White House correspondent for CNN
 Crystal Langhorne (born 1986), WNBA basketball player drafted in 2008 by the Washington Mystics  Won the National Championship in 2006 as a member of the Maryland Terrapins

 Carl Lewis (born 1961), United States Olympic track athlete who won ten Olympic medals (9 gold, 1 silver) and was ranked #1 on the Sports Illustrated list of The 50 Greatest New Jersey Sports Figures"Carl Lewis Sweeps Triple In National Championship", The Miami Herald, June 20, 1983. Accessed July 20, 2007. "Lewis, a 21-year-old from Willingboro, N.J., who had won the 100 in 10.27 Saturday night, leaped a remarkable 28 feet 10¼ inches in capturing the long jump and was clocked in an American record 19.75 seconds in the 200 on the final night of the USA- Mobil Outdoor track and field championships."
 Cleve Lewis (born 1955), retired professional soccer player who was the first African American drafted by the North American Soccer League
 Wali Lundy (born 1983), rapper and former football running back who played in the NFL for the Houston Texans
 Joey Marella (1963–1994), WWE professional wrestling referee, who refereed main event for the indoor attendance record setting match at WrestleMania III between André the Giant versus Hulk Hogan in the Pontiac Silverdome
 Marilyn Marshall (1941–2015), R&B singer/musician
 Tim Marshall, R&B Music Hall of Fame radio host, journalist, educator and humanitarian
 Patrick McFarland (born 1951), former professional basketball player who played in the American Basketball Association for the Denver Rockets, Denver Nuggets, and San Diego Sails
 Kareem McKenzie (born 1979), National Football League offensive tackle.
 David Miscavige (born 1960), leader of the Church of Scientology
 Gorilla Monsoon (1937–1999), WWE Hall of Fame professional wrestler who is a former president of WWE Monsoon, whose real name was Robert James "Gino" Marella, was the adopted father of Joey Marella.
 Dezman Moses (born 1989), National Football League linebacker with the Green Bay Packers
 Kristopher Negron (born 1986), professional baseball utility player who has played for the Cincinnati Reds
 Thomas Olive, deputy-governor of West Jersey from 1684 to 1685, who gave the township its name, based on his birthplace of WellingboroughGuenther, Alan. "Willingboro revives corridor", 
Courier-Post, April 1, 2007. Accessed December 2, 2013. "The town's history dates to 1682, when Thomas Olive became its first colonist and named the town Wellingborough, according to township records."
 Claudette Ortiz (born 1981), singer and model

 Gregory Pardlo (born 1968), poet
 Gervase Peterson (born 1969), contestant on Survivor: Borneo, the first season of the program
 Shaun Phillips (born 1981), National Football League defensive tackle
 Maria Rodriguez-Gregg, member of the New Jersey General Assembly who is the first Republican Hispanic woman to be elected to the New Jersey Legislature
 Keith Saunders (born 1984), professional football linebacker who has played for the Winnipeg Blue Bombers of the Canadian Football League
 Craig Schurig (born 1965), football coach and former player who has been the head coach for the Washburn Ichabods football team since the 2002 season 
 Troy Singleton (born 1973), member of the New Jersey General Assembly from the 7th Legislative District since 2011"Singleton Sworn In As Newest Assembly Member", Assemblyman Troy Singleton, November 21, 2011. Accessed December 2, 2013. "Born in Philadelphia, Singleton was raised in Willingboro, NJ, and currently resides in Palmyra with his wife Megan and their three children."
 LaMont Smith (born 1972), gold medalist at the 1996 Olympic Games in the men's 4x400 meter relay
 Mark Tatulli (born 1963), syndicated comic strip cartoonist and children's book author
 Ryan Toby (born 1976), soul singer, songwriter, producer, and actor best known for playing Wesley Glen Ahmal James in the 1993 film Sister Act 2: Back in the Habit''
 Jimmy Valiant (born 1942), WWE Hall of Fame professional wrestler
 Peter Vermes (born 1966), former professional soccer player who has been  the head coach of Sporting Kansas City in Major League Soccer
 Mark Zagunis (born 1993), professional baseball player

References

External links

Official township website

 
1688 establishments in New Jersey
Faulkner Act (council–manager)
Levittown
Planned communities in the United States
Populated places established in 1688
Sundown towns in New Jersey
Townships in Burlington County, New Jersey